Théo Jeitz (28 November 1897 – August 1976) was a Luxembourgian gymnast. He competed in nine events at the 1924 Summer Olympics.

References

External links
 

1897 births
1976 deaths
Luxembourgian male artistic gymnasts
Olympic gymnasts of Luxembourg
Gymnasts at the 1924 Summer Olympics
People from Differdange